The Ex, also known as the Ex-Girlfriend, and now renamed to Alexa Zombie, is a mannequin produced by Zombie Industries to be a target for gun enthusiasts. The mannequin's name, and the fact that it spouted blood when shot, caused controversy. The target received attention after the National Rifle Association requested that Zombie Industries remove another target that resembled Barack Obama from a vendor booth at the organization's 2013 convention. It was criticized by domestic violence organizations, but the manufacturer claimed that it was not intended to promote violence against women.

Doll
The Ex is a mannequin target with fair skin and a pink bra showing through a white t-shirt. It is designed to bleed when struck by bullets. Other zombie-themed targets manufactured by Zombie Industries have a green skin tone, and the Ex was noted for being the one that looked the most like a living human.

Reactions
The target became known after another one of Zombie Industries' targets was criticized for resembling the then President Barack Obama. The company had displayed their bleeding targets at the 2013 conference of the National Rifle Association (NRA). Groups opposed to domestic violence criticized the target and started a campaign against its manufacturer. Zombie Industries said that they included women as targets because doing otherwise would be sexist. The company said that it did not wish to discriminate against or promote violence against women. Amid criticism, Zombie Industries renamed the doll Alexa Zombie and promised to redesign the target to make it look distinct from a human woman. The company denied reports that they had displayed the target in their booth at the NRA convention.

References

Dummies and mannequins
Sports targets
2010s controversies in the United States
2013 controversies
Zombies and revenants in popular culture
Sculptures of women in the United States